Echoes (stylized as ECHOƎS) is a drama television miniseries that premiered on Netflix on 19 August 2022.

Synopsis
The miniseries is a mystery thriller about identical twins Leni and Gina, who share a dangerous secret. They have secretly swapped lives since they were children, culminating in a double life as adults where they share two homes, two husbands, and a child. Their world is thrown into disarray when one of the twins goes missing.

Cast

Main
 Michelle Monaghan as Leni and Gina McCleary, twin sisters
 Matt Bomer as Jack Beck
 Daniel Sunjata as Charles "Charlie" Davenport, Gina's husband who is a therapist 
 Ali Stroker as Claudia McCleary, the older sister of Leni and Gina who has been paralyzed waist down since one of the twins had deliberately pushed her as a girl and now moves around in a wheelchair
 Karen Robinson as Sheriff Louise Floss
 Rosanny Zayas as Deputy Paula Martinez
 Michael O'Neill as Victor McCleary
 Celia Weston as Georgia Tyler
 Gable Swanlund as Mathilda "Mattie" Beck, Jack and Leni's nine-year-old daughter and Gina's niece 
 Jonathan Tucker as Dylan James

Recurring
 Tyner Rushing as Maria Czerny McCleary
 Madison Abbott as a Young Leni McCleary
 Victoria Abbott as a Young Gina McCleary
 Clayton Royal Johnson as a Young Dylan James
 Alise Willis as Meg
 Maddie Nichols as Natasha
 Lucy Hammond as a Young Claudia McCleary
 Onye Eme-Akwari as Beau McMillan
 Lauren H. Davis as Liss

Episodes

Production
Echoes was created and written by Vanessa Gazy, who also co-executive produced with Brian Yorkey, Quinton Peeples and Imogen Banks of EndemolShine Banks Australia. Yorkey and Peeples both served as showrunners. Michelle Monaghan starred in this miniseries. Matt Bomer added to the cast in a lead role. Daniel Sunjata added to the cast in a lead role. Ali Stroker, Karen Robinson and Rosanny Zayas added to the cast as series regulars. In October 2021, Michael O'Neill, Celia Weston, Gable Swanlund, Tyner Rushing, Hazel Mason, Ginger Mason, Alise Willis, Maddie Nichols and Jonathan Tucker were added to the cast. The series premiered on 19 August 2022.

Although it is an Australian production, this series is set in the United States. Filming took place in Wilmington, North Carolina.

Reception
On Rotten Tomatoes, Echoes has an overall approval rating of 24% with an average score of 4.8/10 based on 21 reviews, with the site's consensus being, "Double the Michelle Monaghan should be a winning proposition, but Echoes is a resounding misfire whose promise grows fainter with each silly twist." Metacritic, which uses a weighted average, assigned a score of 46 out of 100 based on 9 critics, indicating "mixed or average reviews".

References

External links
 
 

2022 Australian television series debuts
2020s Australian drama television series
2022 Australian television series endings
English-language Netflix original programming 
Television series about sisters
Television series about twins 
Television shows filmed in North Carolina 
Television shows filmed in Wilmington, North Carolina
Television shows set in Virginia
Thriller television series